The peso was the currency of Honduras between 1862 and 1931.

History
The peso replaced the real at a rate of 1 peso = 8 reales. Initially, the peso was subdivided into 8 reales. In 1871, the currency was decimalized, with the peso subdivided into 100 centavos. The peso was replaced in 1931 by the lempira at par.

Coins
The first coin issues in 1862 were a provisional copper coinage in denominations of 1, 2, 4 and 8 pesos. This was followed between 1869 and 1871 by a cupro-nickel coinage in denominations of ⅛, ¼, ½ and 1 real.

Silver 5, 10, 25 and 50 centavos and gold 1 peso coins were introduced that in 1871 following decimalization. Bronze 1 centavo coins were introduced in 1878, with bronze 2 centavos and silver 1 pesos added in 1881. Gold 5, 10 and 20 pesos coins were introduced between 1883 and 1889.

Banknotes
In 1886, the Aguan Navigation and Improvement Company issued its first paper money. The Banco Centro-Americano began note production in 1888, followed by the Honduran government in 1889, with several more banks issuing notes later. Denominations ranged between 50 centavos and 100 pesos.

History of Honduras
Modern obsolete currencies
1862 establishments in Honduras
1931 disestablishments
Currencies of Honduras